The most influential part of the executive of the Government of the Netherlands are the ministries. There are twelve ministries of the Netherlands, all with their own minister. There are also several ministers without portfolio and about as many State Secretaries.

List